Khong may refer to:
Khong District, Laos, a district of Champasak Province
Khong Island, in Laos
Khong District, Nakhon Ratchasima, Thailand
Khong, Iran (disambiguation), places in Iran

People with the surname 
Lawrence Khong (born 1952), Singaporean Christian leader
Yuen Foong Khong (born 1956), Malaysian political scientist
Kelvin Khong (born ), Singaporean general
Rachel Khong (born 1985), Malaysian-born American writer
Khổng Tú Quỳnh (born 1991), Vietnamese pop singer
Khổng Thị Hằng (born 1993), Vietnamese footballer

See also 
 
 Mekong River, also known as Khong River